Triscolia ardens is a species of wasp in the family Scoliidae. It is the sole member of its genus found in North America.

Description

This species resembles Scolia dubia, without the yellow spots distinctive to that species. As with other scoliids, the females have short antennae, while the males have long antennae, and possess a "three pronged pseudosting".

Habitat

Open fields, meadows, open areas in general, where they fly near to the ground, in search of prey.

Behavior

This species will often burrow underground, find, sting, and lay eggs on a grub, and build a cell around it, covering up the hole.

References 

Scoliidae
Insects described in 1855